Greenway High School is a public secondary school located in Phoenix, Arizona.  It is a part of the Glendale Union High School District. It was named after John Campbell Greenway, a mining engineer and United States Senator.
In the 1994–95 and 1995-96 school years, it was honored as a Blue Ribbon school.

History 
Greenway opened in 1973 Thunderbird High School opened one year earlier, both schools feature the same architectural blueprints. Designed by Rossman Partners the buildings were constructed exclusively of metal with minimal ornamentation. Defco Construction Company of Tucson was general contractor who built the school.

Academics 
Greenway High School offers a small variety of advanced placement classes, as well as honors and dual enrollment.

Clubs and programs

Naval Science NJROTC 
 Greenway NJROTC earned the title of Distinguished Unit for the 4th year in a row in 2012. 
 On October 6, the Air Rifle Team competed at Carver Mountain Air Rifle Match. The team placed 1st overall. 
 On October 20, the Air Rifle Team competed at the 2012 Area 11 Qualifier and East/West Air Rifle Championship. The team won both matches for the 4th year in a row.

Notable alumni

 Pete Babcock — Head Coach of Varsity 1978-79 basketball team; GM of Toronto Raptors, Denver Nuggets, and Atlanta Hawks
Chester Bennington — Linkin Park (graduated from Washington High School)
 In the auditorium hallway, a mural can be found of Bennington's.
 Trevor Blake — Major League Baseball player
Richie Brockel — NFL tight end for the San Diego Chargers and Carolina Panthers
Dan Butler — Major League Baseball catcher for the Boston Red Sox
 Connie Clark — title-winning college softball player, Texas Longhorns softball program coach from 1997-2018
Lauren Froderman — winner of Season 7 of So You Think You Can Dance
Jennie Garth — former cast member on Beverly Hills, 90210
Tiffany Granath — Playboy radio personality; former host of Playboy TV's Nightcalls
Josh Hansen — professional soccer player
Brad Lohaus — former NBA player
Alejo López — Major League Baseball infielder for the Cincinnati Reds
Shannon Marketic — Miss USA 1992
Tony McConkey - politician, Maryland State Delegate
Josh McDermitt — actor, The Walking Dead, Retired at 35, Last Comic Standing
Frank Pollack — former NFL player w/ San Francisco 49ers, Super Bowl XXIX
Tim Salmon — former MLB player with the Anaheim Angels
Mike Salmon —  former NFL player with the San Francisco 49ers and Buffalo Bills
Lauren Scott — Nevada politician, lobbyist and civil rights activist
Kimberly Yee — Arizona State Treasurer

References

External links
 Greenway High School

Public high schools in Arizona
Educational institutions established in 1973
High schools in Phoenix, Arizona
1973 establishments in Arizona